Dirk Henn (born 1960) is a German-style board game designer who was born in Bendorf, Germany.

Dirk Henn is best known for his game Alhambra, which won the Spiel des Jahres and placed 2nd in the Deutscher Spiele Preis in 2003.

Game Company Affiliation
 db-Spiele, Self-Publishing Company
 Queen Games

Selected list of games
a full list is available in the external links section.
 Carat, 1993
 Rosenkönig, 1997
 Wallenstein, 2002
 Alhambra, 2003
 Shogun, 2006 (revision of Wallenstein)

External links 
  - Game Designer Page
  - db-Spiele Publisher Page

Board game designers
1960 births
Living people